La Capilla 515 is an apartment complex in San Benito, San Salvador. It is one of the tallest apartment structures in the country. The building was constructed by Inversiones Bolivar, a Salvadorian construction and architecture company.

Information 

 Location: Avenida La Capilla, San Salvador
 Floor Count: 16 & 12
 Estimated Height: 64m/209 ft & 48m/157 ft
 Start Date: Mid-2004
 Completed Date: Early 2006
 Facilities: Gym, Green Areas, Pool, Parking, Country Club.

References 

Buildings and structures in San Salvador